is a Japanese make-up artist and businesswoman.

In 2009, she started the "Coffret Project". She is CEO of the cosmetics company "Lalitpur". She was awarded the Avon Women's Prize (エイボン女性年度賞) in 2012.

References

Link

 

Japanese make-up artists
21st-century Japanese businesswomen
21st-century Japanese businesspeople
Keio University alumni
Living people
1982 births
People from Ishinomaki